Alberto De Francesco (born 12 October 1994) is an Italian professional footballer who plays as a midfielder for  club Mantova.

Club career
He made his Serie C debut for L'Aquila on 30 August 2014 in a game against Gubbio.

On 16 August 2019, he returned to Reggina on a two-year contract.

On 17 September 2020 he became a new Avellino player.

On 13 July 2022, De Francesco moved to Mantova.

References

External links
 
 

1994 births
Living people
Footballers from Rome
Italian footballers
Association football midfielders
Serie B players
Serie C players
S.S. Lazio players
S.S. Ischia Isolaverde players
L'Aquila Calcio 1927 players
Reggina 1914 players
Spezia Calcio players
U.S. Avellino 1912 players
Mantova 1911 players